Frederik Marcus Knuth, 5th Count of Knuthenborg  (11 January 1813 – 8 January 1856) was a Danish aristocrat, landowner, civil servant and politician.

A member of the Knuth family, he was educated at home and later at the University of Copenhagen. From 1847 to 1848 he served as amtmand in Sorø Amt. After the introduction of the constitutional monarchy in 1848, Knuth served as the first Minister of Foreign Affairs of Denmark from March to November 1848. From November 1848, he was member of The Danish Constituent Assembly as one of the members appointed by the king.

With the title of enfeoffed count, he was the fifth holder of the County of Knuthenborg on the island of Lolland from 1818 to 1856.

Notes and references

Bibliography

External links 
 Official website of Knuthenborg Castle

1813 births
1856 deaths
19th-century Danish jurists
19th-century Danish landowners
19th-century Danish politicians
Danish civil servants
Foreign ministers of Denmark
Danish counts
Knuth family
Members of the Folketing
Members of the Landsting (Denmark)
Members of the Constituent Assembly of Denmark